Xenochroma is a genus of moths in the family Geometridae.

, the following nine species are recognized:
 Xenochroma aetherea 
 Xenochroma angulosa 
 Xenochroma candidata 
 Xenochroma dyschlorata 
 Xenochroma palimpais 
 Xenochroma planimargo 
 Xenochroma roseimargo 
 Xenochroma salsa 
 Xenochroma silvatica

References

Geometridae
Taxa named by William Warren (entomologist)